San Rafael, officially the Municipality of San Rafael,  is a 5th class municipality in the province of Iloilo, Philippines. According to the 2020 census, it has a population of 17,795 people.

It is bordered by Dumarao to the north, Lemery to the east, Barotac Viejo to the south, and Passi City to the west.

San Rafael have Nine (9) barangays, namely Aripdip, Bagacay, Calaigang, Ilongbukid, Poblacion, Poscolon, San Andres, San Dionisio, and San Florentino, make up the municipality of San Rafael. San Dionisio, one of the nine barangays, has the most land area (1,772.5532 hectares), while Aripdip has the least (486.4018 hectares). Poblacion, San Florentino, and San Andres are the next three largest barangays, with 1,476.3524 hectares, 993.5601 hectares, and 974.0931 hectares, respectively.

History
In 1969, all or part of 16 barrios (barangays) of Barotac Viejo were separated from that town and consolidated into the new municipality. However, in 1971 Republic Act No. 6267 decreed that 5 barrios be restored to Barotac Viejo, with the barrio of Omio becoming part of Lemery.

Fire
In February 2012, a fire damaged 18 stalls in the public market. As San Rafael has no fire station, fire trucks had to be called in from nearby towns.

Typhoon Haiyan
Typhoon Haiyan passed over Panay Island on November 8, 2013, affecting San Rafael along with several other coastal cities. The provincial board declared the state of Iloilo to be in a state of emergency, after acting governor Raul C. Tupas toured the fifth district. Local convenience stores were heavily damaged during the storm, although at least one reopened soon after. Several houses were damaged during the typhoon. They were destroyed by strong wind and falling trees. After a few days, relief soon arrived. Several new houses were built by a religious organization.

Geography

Climate

Nine (9) barangays, namely Aripdip, Bagacay, Calaigang, Ilongbukid, Poblacion, Poscolon, San Andres, San Dionisio, and San Florentino, make up the municipality of San Rafael. San Dionisio, one of the nine barangays, has the most land area (1,772.5532 hectares), while Aripdip has the least (486.4018 hectares). Poblacion, San Florentino, and San Andres are the next three largest barangays, with 1,476.3524 hectares, 993.5601 hectares, and 974.0931 hectares, respectively.

Barangays
San Rafael is politically subdivided into 9 barangays.
 Aripdip
 Bagacay
 Calaigang
 Ilongbukid
 Poscolon
 San Andres
 San Dionisio
 San Florentino
 Poblacion

Demographics

Economy

Government
In 2013, Beboy Belleza was re-elected as mayor by an almost 2-1 margin.

Education

San Rafael has elementary schools in almost all barangays. There is a primary school in Bagacay. San Rafael Central School is located in Poblacion. Children spend 2 years in kindergarten and 6 years in elementary.

San Rafael has two high schools: San Rafael National High School was established in 1983, while Ilongbukid National High School was created in 2000. Students spend 4 years in high school. There are 4 grading periods each school year. The 4th grading period is the most important because it determines if the student will advance a grade the next school year.

Secondary school starts with 1st Year and ends with 4th Year. The subjects for Grade 1 students are English, Mathematics, Pilipino, and Sibika at Cultura (History and Culture). English language is used as the language of instruction for English, Mathematics, and Science. Grade 2 students take English, Mathematics, Science, Sibika at Kutura, Agriculture. Grade 3-6 students take additional courses, such as Music, Art, P.E., and Hekasi (it contains 5 subjects but is graded as one subject).

References

External links
 [ Philippine Standard Geographic Code]
 Philippine Census Information
 Local Governance Performance Management System

Municipalities of Iloilo